Franz Blücher (24 March 1896 – 26 March 1959) was a German politician and member of the German Parliament (Bundestag).

Biography 
Blücher was born in Essen, Kingdom of Prussia.

After the end of World War II, he was one of the founders of the Free Democratic Party (FDP) and served as chairman in the British occupation zone (1946-1949) and as Federal Chairman (1949-1954).

From 1949 to 1957, Blücher was a member of Chancellor Konrad Adenauer's cabinet. As representative of the second-largest government party, he was the first vice-chancellor of West Germany and also held the Ministry for Matters of the Marshall Plan, which in 1953 was renamed Ministry for Economic Cooperation.

In 1956, Blücher – along with other fifteen ministers and parliamentarians – sided with Chancellor Adenauer against his party and formed the Free People's Party (FVP), which early in 1957 merged with the German Party (DP).

Blücher died on 26 March 1959 in Bad Godesberg, Bonn, West Germany.

Honours and awards
Blücher was awarded honorary doctorates from the University of Berlin (1954) and the University of the Punjab in Lahore (1957). In 1954, he was awarded the Grand Cross of the Order of Merit and the Grand Cross of the Greek Order of George I. In 1955, he received the Grand Cross of Merit of the Italian Republic.

In 1956, Blücher received the Grand Decoration of Honour in Gold with Sash for Services to the Republic of Austria.

References

1896 births
1959 deaths
Members of the Bundestag for North Rhine-Westphalia
Politicians from Essen
People from the Rhine Province
Vice-Chancellors of Germany
Grand Crosses 1st class of the Order of Merit of the Federal Republic of Germany
Grand Crosses of the Order of George I
Knights Grand Cross of the Order of Merit of the Italian Republic
Recipients of the Grand Decoration with Sash for Services to the Republic of Austria
German Party (1947) politicians
Members of the Bundestag for the Free Democratic Party (Germany)
Members of the Bundestag 1957–1961
Members of the Bundestag 1953–1957
Members of the Bundestag 1949–1953